OCAP may stand for:
Ontario Coalition Against Poverty
OpenCable Application Platform
Object-capability model ("Object Capabilities")